New Brighton is a coastal suburb of Christchurch, New Zealand,  east of the city centre. It is one of eastern Christchurch's main entertainment and tourist centres, with its architecturally unique pier and scenic coastline. The 2011 Christchurch earthquakes caused significant damage in the area.

History

Māori connections 
New Brighton is of cultural significance for the local iwi or tribe Ngāi Tahu who are the kaitiaki or guardians of this takiwa or area. Ngāi Tūāhuriri hapū, a sub-tribe of Ngāi Tahu, hold manawhenua status (territorial rights) in respect to this area. Te Tai o Mahaanui refers to the coast and surrounding land of which New Brighton is a part.

Naming 

The naming of New Brighton was apparently done on the 'spur of the moment' by William Fee, an early settler of the area. When Guise Brittan, the Waste Lands Commissioner, visited the area in December 1860, he was recognised and Fee chalked 'New Brighton' on a wooden plank, supposedly in reference to his fellow settler Stephen Brooker, who had come from New Brighton in England. The suburb is frequently referred to simply as Brighton, occasionally leading to confusion with Brighton near Dunedin.

Early settlement 
Māori people were the first settlers in Canterbury and arrived around the 13th century according to western archaeological evidence, though Māori whakapapa (genealogies) date settlement before this period of time with the discovery of the South Island by Waitaha ancestor, Rākaihautū. Traditional food gathering or mahinga kai sites of Waitaha, Rapuwai, Kāti Mamoe and subsequently Ngāi Tahu iwi included Ihutai (Avon Heathcote Estuary) nearby to New Brighton. Walking trails between Ngāi Tahu settlements (kāika) passed close to New Brighton's present day commercial centre.  A sand dune track called Pohoareare ran around Ihutai between Ōpāwaho kāika (settlement) on the Heathcote River and New Brighton, a popular iwi destination for swimming and catching horihori (sole).

The first English settler's home in the area was built in 1858 by Walker. From 1860 on, increasingly more settlers started to be interested in New Brighton. The first settlers built their houses from manuka scrub and clay. These cob and sod houses were quite simple with one big room which was partitioned later, weatherboards on the outside walls, beaten clay floor and an oil drum for cooking purposes. Beside the lack of infrastructure, the first settlers had to deal with the nature of the area which consisted of sand dunes with nearly no vegetation. Strong winds could deposit a foot of sand on the first improvised New Brighton roads. Shifting sand was managed by vegetation planting. After a lot of trial and error during which many grass types were planted, it was decided that lupins and marram-grass were the best for stabilising the sand dunes. By 1899, officials had planted a ton of marram-grass.

One of the first businessmen who saw potential in New Brighton was English settler Joseph Harrop Hopkins. On 7 November 1872, Hopkins purchased 150 acres for £300. Within two years, Hopkins built a boarding house and a hotel. After approval from the Licensing Authority on 28 April 1874, the hotel was named "New Brighton". In order to attract new visitors to the area and provide a comfortable and attractive mode of transport, Hopkins purchased an expensive 170-passenger paddle steamer which run daily from central Christchurch (Wards Brewery) to New Brighton. However the steamer didn't attract as much attention as desired and Hopkins fell into financial troubles. In 1875, he had to sell the steamer and his land.

Early development of the area was slow. By 1884, according to official records, only 16 houses were present. From 1885, a gradual increase in the number of houses occurred, roads and streets were planned, and the first shops appeared. Development accelerated in the following years. The area used be known simply as the "Beach", which was part of the Avon River Road Board District. As the development continued, the area became a borough in 1897. By 1901, New Brighton reached 1,008 residents. This number further increased to around 4,000 by 1922.

Transportation

Before the first roads were built, it was challenging to get to the area. New Brighton was originally separated from the then outer suburbs of Christchurch by the swampy areas adjoining the Avon River. Later on, urban expansion, land reclamation and drainage led to New Brighton being connected to Christchurch city. The first English settlers carried goods to and from New Brighton on a galvanised cart drawn by an ox. Manuka scrub was frequently used as a ground cover to prevent the cart from being bogged. The first road to New Brighton followed the Avon River / Ōtākaro.  In 1874, the poor quality of the roading, due to the moving sands of the area, led to the matter being brought to the urgent attention of the Superintendent of the Canterbury Provincial Council, in order to secure funding to improve the roads.  Maintenance and improvement of the area's roading was affected by the borough's income.  From 1897, a water cart was used on dirt roads, and in 1896 gravel began to be laid on some of the roads.

Early public transport
In 1861, the first commercial coach service commenced, and from 1872, there were daily coach services from Christchurch which attracted more settlement in the area including boarding houses, baches, holiday homes and permanent houses.

Trams

Trams were first introduced to Christchurch thanks to the Canterbury Tramway Company, which was founded in 1878.  The first tram services commenced in central Christchurch in 1880, with the tramway system consisting of several lines and stations. Buoyed by its success, the New Brighton Tramway Company was formed in 1885 with the purpose of providing a tram connection from the eastern end of the central Christchurch tramway network, at Linwood, out to New Brighton. Construction of the line, which followed Pages Road, commenced in 1887 and was completed early the following year, with fare-paying services commencing on 15 February 1888. The service proved to be popular, garnering between 3,000 and 5,000 passengers per week. A second tram route, which became known as the North Beach tramline, was constructed by the City and Suburban Tramway Company, passing through Linwood, Avonside, Shirley, Avondale, Rawhiti, before ending at the New Brighton Pier, was completed in 1894. 

In this era, the trams on both routes were horse-drawn. It was only with the formation of the Christchurch Tramway Board in 1905 and which took over the assets of the local tramway companies, that steam engines were introduced to the New Brighton lines. Electrification of the New Brighton tramway lines was completed in August 1906.

Trolley buses
Over time, the North Beach route proved uneconomic, mainly due to the poor state of the track not enabling the trams to compete with the private Inter City Motors' buses which ran along the same route.  The tramline was closed in 1931, with a new electric trolley bus service commencing in its place.  The bus company was eventually purchased by the board in 1935, allowing the Board to have a monopoly on that route. 

The fate of the main New Brighton tramway line followed that of the economy. The Great Depression of the 1930s caused a decline in patronage, but increased during WWII due to the restrictions placed on other forms of motorised transport.  By the late 1940s, the growth of the Christchurch urban and suburban areas, along with increased rates of car ownership meant that the trams were no longer the best mode for public transport.  In a process lasting from 1947 to 1951, the Christchurch Transport Board made a series of decisions to phase out the trams, and replace them with diesel-powered buses.

Buses

The transition away from trams proceeded apace in 1951 when the Christchurch Tramway Board ordered 57 diesel buses, with their routes following that of the former tram and trolley bus network. The Christchurch-New Brighton line was closed down on 18 October 1952. The 5 Brighton bus route, following the same route along Pages Road, commenced the same day. The use of buses allowed other routes to be incorporated into public transport network; these included 5A Aldwins Road, 5B Breezes Road, and 5S South Brighton.  The 10 Marshland Road and Richmond bus service, which fed into the North Beach route, commenced on 31 May 1956.  The 19 North Beach bus service, which followed what had been the North Beach tram, and then trolley bus, route, commenced on 8 November 1956.        

In 1984, two new services, the 30 & 31 Seaside Specials were started to bring people from the southern and northern suburbs, respectively, to New Brighton on Saturdays for shopping. With the introduction of weekend trading, the demand for these services wained, and the buses were discontinued. 

In 2022, New Brighton is serviced by the following bus routes, all operated under the Metro brand:

Christchurch earthquakes aftermath 
Due in part to the ground on which it was built, the consequences for New Brighton of the 2011 earthquake did not only relate to building damage.

In December 2012 residents held a protest against the perceived slow progress of rebuilding in the area following the region's damaging earthquakes, in which 80 people bared their bottoms. Christchurch Mayor Bob Parker said he wasn't offended, but the residents were "wrong". These feelings of neglect by the Christchurch City Council would continue to persist. The People's Independent Republic of New Brighton was formed by Paul Zaaman, a New Brighton businesses and landowners association spokesperson, in order to protest a perceived lack of investment by the Christchurch City Council into New Brighton.

New Brighton was named to be the host of the finish of the annual Coast to Coast multisport race in February 2015. The previous finishing point of the race was in Sumner.
There were plans to redevelop the town centre after the earthquakes. As of 2022, this has not happened.

Location
The suburb is divided into three sections spread along the southern coast of Pegasus Bay: North New Brighton; New Brighton; and South New Brighton, which lies at the northern end of a narrow peninsula between the bay and the Avon Heathcote Estuary. A  pier was built here in the 1990s, and opened on 1 November 1997.

New Brighton was originally a distinct coastal village, separated from the then outer suburbs of Christchurch by the swampy areas adjoining the Avon River. However, urban expansion, land reclamation and drainage have led to New Brighton being connected to Christchurch city.

Demographics

New Brighton, comprising the statistical areas of New Brighton and Rawhiti, had a population of 6,099 at the 2018 New Zealand census, an increase of 153 people (2.6%) since the 2013 census, and a decrease of 498 people (−7.5%) since the 2006 census. There were 2,544 households. There were 3,018 males and 3,084 females, giving a sex ratio of 0.98 males per female, with 1,134 people (18.6%) aged under 15 years, 1,143 (18.7%) aged 15 to 29, 2,952 (48.4%) aged 30 to 64, and 876 (14.4%) aged 65 or older.

Ethnicities were 88.7% European/Pākehā, 14.2% Māori, 4.0% Pacific peoples, 3.4% Asian, and 2.5% other ethnicities (totals add to more than 100% since people could identify with multiple ethnicities).

The proportion of people born overseas was 18.5%, compared with 27.1% nationally.

Although some people objected to giving their religion, 59.7% had no religion, 27.1% were Christian, 0.4% were Hindu, 0.3% were Muslim, 0.5% were Buddhist and 3.9% had other religions.

Of those at least 15 years old, 846 (17.0%) people had a bachelor or higher degree, and 1,065 (21.5%) people had no formal qualifications. The employment status of those at least 15 was that 2,454 (49.4%) people were employed full-time, 708 (14.3%) were part-time, and 234 (4.7%) were unemployed.

Economy
For several decades, New Brighton had the distinction of being the only place in Christchurch where general retail shops were permitted to open on Saturdays (remaining closed on Mondays), and the business district thrived as a result. With the introduction of nationwide Saturday trading in 1980, and then seven-day trading in 1990, retail activity declined significantly.

The 2011 Christchurch earthquake compounded New Brighton's struggle for economic wellbeing creating vacant derelict sites in its main retail centre. As part of the New Brighton Regeneration Project, the Beachside Playground has been upgraded and He Puna Taimoana saltwater hot pools built. 

Housing projects are planned by a range of developers including Williams Corporation who sold 37 townhouses situated in 180 Marine Parade within 24 hours in March 2022 and The Home Foundation who are building over 60 terraced homes in a development called Te Pakau Maru on Beresford Street.  Paradigm Group are planning a mix of ground floor retail with 16 upstairs apartments at the vacant site of 101 Brighton Mall.

Landmarks

New Brighton Pier 

On 18 January 1894, the first New Brighton pier was opened by the Governor of New Zealand, the Earl of Glasgow. Some commentators believe that this potential of New Brighton as a recreational and health resort similar to English New Brighton has not been realised, possibly because of its prevalent harsh winds, poor soils and the somewhat shabby image of the suburb. The pier stood until 1965 when it was demolished as the run down structure wasn't deemed safe by the City Council.

In 1999, a library and cafe building was erected at the pier's base. The building received awards from New Zealand Institute of Architects. The pier was closed for earthquake repairs in 2016 and reopened again in May 2018. It has become one of the icons of Christchurch.

Education
New Brighton contains two high schools, situated side by side being Shirley Boys' High School and Avonside Girls' High School and three primary schools: 

 New Brighton Catholic School: a state-integrated full primary school for years 1 to 8, established in 1935. 
 Nova Montessori School: a private full primary school for years 1 to 8, established in 1988.
 Rāwhiti School: a state full primary school for years 1 to 8, opened in January 2015 as the result of a merger of Central New Brighton, Freeville, and North New Brighton schools.
The suburb also has a number of kindergarten and childcare facilities, including New Brighton Community Preschool and Nursery.

Sport and recreation
Rāwhiti Domain is the main sports field in the suburb, and has facilities for the New Brighton Rugby Football Club and the New Brighton Olympic Athletic Club. The suburb also has a bowling club, located at the Returned Services' Association building. 

The New Brighton Surf Bathing and Life Saving Club is the oldest surf life saving club in New Zealand, having been established in July 1910.

References

Literature

External links
 NIWA: Pier-cam hourly image
 New Brighton Pier, circa 1915, Christchurch City Libraries
 New Brighton Surf Club 
 Edge of the East 2016, Christchurch City Libraries

Suburbs of Christchurch
Surfing locations in New Zealand